The National Integrated College (NIC) is a private higher secondary institution in Kathmandu, Nepal.

The school educates at Grades 11 and 12 level for which it is affiliated with the Higher Secondary Education Board. It also provides bachelor's degree courses for which it is affiliated with the Tribhuvan University.

References

External links
 

Universities and colleges in Nepal
Educational institutions established in 2001
2001 establishments in Nepal
Education in Kathmandu